Li Li is a fictional character in Water Margin, one of the Four Great Classical Novels in Chinese literature. Nicknamed "Life Taking Judge", he ranks 96th among the 108 Stars of Destiny and 60th among the 72 Earthly Fiends.

Background
The novel depicts Li Li as having a reddish beard and fiery round eyes like those of a tiger. Born in Luzhou (蘆州; present-day Hefei, Anhui), he moves to Jieyang Ridge (揭陽嶺; believed to be in present-day Jiujiang, Jiangxi), where he robs customers after knocking them unconscious with spiked drinks and then butchers them to make filling in baozi with their flesh. He is a close friend of Li Jun, who smuggles salt on Xunyang River, which flows below Jieyang Ridge.

Joining Liangshan
When Song Jiang is on the way to his exile in Jiangzhou (江州; present-day Jiujiang, Jiangxi), a reduced sentence for killing his mistress Yan Poxi, he and his two escorts pass by Jieyang Ridge and come to eat in Li Li's inn. The three are knocked out. Li Li is waiting for his assistants to come to help cut them up when Li Jun and his sidekicks Tong Wei and Tong Meng come to his inn for some refreshment. Li Jun checks the official documents on the escorts and is shocked to learn that the exile is Song Jiang, the chivalrous hero he greatly admires. In fact, Li Jun has been waiting for days in hopes of meeting Song at the river bank. Li Li quickly revives the three and apologises to Song. The four treat Song Jiang as an honoured guest until he leaves for Jiangzhou.

In Jiangzhou Song Jiang is arrested and sentenced to death for being the author of a  seditious poem found on a wall in a restaurant. The outlaws from Liangshan Marsh rush to Jiangzhou and save him just when he is going to be beheaded. But they are stranded at a river bank. In the meantime, friends that Song Jiang has made in the Jieyang region, led by Li Jun and including Li Li, are sailing to Jiangzhou to rescue Song. They come upon the group and ferry them to safety. Together they head to Liangshan, where Li Li becomes one of the chieftains.

Campaigns and death
Li Li is put in charge of an inn that acts as a lookout for Liangshan after the 108 Stars of Destiny came together in what is called the Grand Assembly. He participates in the campaigns against the Liao invaders and rebel forces in Song territory following amnesty from Emperor Huizong for Liangshan.

In the battle of Qingxi County (清溪縣; present-day Chun'an County, Zhejiang) in the campaign against Fang La, Li Li is severely injured and dies soon from the wounds.

References
 
 
 
 
 
 
 

72 Earthly Fiends
Fictional characters from Anhui